Yuya Nakamura may refer to:

, Japanese footballer
, Japanese footballer
Enhō Akira, born Yuya Nakamura, Japanese sumo wrestler